Archaeoprepona demophon, the one-spotted prepona, banded king shoemaker, or demophon shoemaker is a butterfly belonging to the family Nymphalidae.

Description
The uppersides of the wings are black, with bright pale blue transverse bands. The undersides are pale brown with a clearer band in the middle of the hindwings and several dark small dots on the margins.

Foodplants
The butterfly larva generally feed on plants of the genus Annona (Annonaceae) and on Malpighia glabra (Malpighiaceae).  Adults visit rotten fruit or dung.

Distribution
This species can be found in Mexico, Central America, the West Indies, and northern portions of South America.

Habitat
Archaeoprepona demophon prefers the edges of forest canopy and subcanopy.

Gallery

Subspecies
Archaeoprepona demophon demophon (Surinam)
Archaeoprepona demophon thalpius (Hübner, [1814]) (Brazil (Santa Catarina, Minas Gerais, Espírito Santo, Bahia, Rio Grande do Sul))
Archaeoprepona demophon extincta (Staudinger, 1886)
Archaeoprepona demophon centralis (Fruhstorfer, [1905]) (Mexico to Panama, Honduras)
Archaeoprepona demophon muson (Fruhstorfer, 1905) (Colombia, Ecuador, Bolivia)
Archaeoprepona demophon occidentalis (Stoffel & Descimon, 1974) (Mexico)

References

 DeVries, Philip J. (1987). The Butterflies of Costa Rica and Their Natural History, Volume I: Papilionidae, Pieridae, Nymphalidae. Princeton University Press, New Jersey, 327 pp.
 Lewis, H. L. (1974). Butterflies of the World. 
 Especies de Costa Rica
 Llorente-Bousquets, J., Descimon, H., and K. Johnson. (1993). Taxonomy and biogeography of Archaeoprepona demophoon in Mexico, with description of a new subspecies (Lepidoptera: Nymphalidae: Charaxinae). Tropical Lepidoptera 4(1): 31-36.  pdf

External links

 Archaeoprepona demophon (The Nymphalidae Systematics Group website)
 One-spotted Prepona  (Archaeoprepona demophon), Neotropical Butterflies
 Archaeoprepona demophon occidentalis (Stoffel & Descimon, 1974) (One-spotted Prepona), Butterflies of America

Charaxinae
Butterflies described in 1758
Fauna of Brazil
Nymphalidae of South America
Taxa named by Carl Linnaeus